The Faroe Islands Cup 2001 was played between March 3 and July 29, 2001. The cup was won by B36 Tórshavn.

Preliminary round

| colspan="3" style="background:#9cc;"|March 3, 2000

|-
| colspan="3" style="background:#9cc;"|March 7, 2000

|-
| colspan="3" style="background:#9cc;"|March 11, 2000

|}

First round

| colspan="3" style="background:#9cc;"|March 15, 2000

|-
| colspan="3" style="background:#9cc;"|March 16, 2000

|}

Second round

Group 1

Group 2

Group 3

Quarterfinals

| colspan="3" style="background:#9cc;"|May 21, 2000

|}

Semifinals
The first legs were played on May 13, 2001, and the second legs on May 24, 2001.

|}

Final

See also

Faroe Islands Super Cup

References

External links
 RSSSF

Faroe Islands Cup seasons
Cup